Penelope Mary Mordaunt (born 4 March 1973) is a British politician who has been Leader of the House of Commons and Lord President of the Council since September 2022. A member of the Conservative Party, she has been Member of Parliament (MP) for Portsmouth North since May 2010. She served as a junior minister under Boris Johnson, having previously served in Theresa May's Cabinet as Secretary of State for International Development from 2017 to 2019, and as Secretary of State for Defence from May to July 2019. She ran twice for the Conservative party leadership in July–September, and October 2022, losing to Liz Truss and Rishi Sunak respectively.

Mordaunt read philosophy at the University of Reading, before working in the public relations industry. She held roles within the Conservative Party under party leaders John Major and William Hague, and also worked for George W. Bush's presidential campaigns in 2000 and 2004. Mordaunt was elected to the House of Commons in May 2010. Under the coalition government of David Cameron, she served as Parliamentary Under-Secretary of State for Decentralisation from 2014 to 2015. After the 2015 general election, Cameron promoted her to Minister of State for the Armed Forces, the first woman to hold the post. Mordaunt supported Brexit in the 2016 referendum on EU membership. Following Theresa May's appointment as Prime Minister, Mordaunt was appointed Minister of State for Disabled People, Work and Health. In 2017, following the resignation of Priti Patel, she was appointed Secretary of State for International Development. She also served as Minister for Women and Equalities from 2018 to 2019.

In May 2019, Mordaunt was appointed to the senior Cabinet post of Secretary of State for Defence, replacing Gavin Williamson, becoming the first woman to hold the post. She served as Defence Secretary for 85 days before returning to the backbenches, having been removed from the position by the new Prime Minister Boris Johnson. In the February 2020 reshuffle, she re-entered government as Paymaster General. In the 2021 reshuffle, she was appointed Minister of State for Trade Policy.

Following Johnson's announcement in July 2022 that he would resign as leader of the Conservative Party and Prime Minister, Mordaunt entered the leadership contest to succeed him, but was eliminated in the final round of voting among Conservative MPs and subsequently endorsed Liz Truss. Mordaunt was appointed as Leader of the House of Commons when Truss became Prime Minister. Following Truss's resignation on 20 October 2022, Mordaunt made a second bid to become Conservative leader and Prime Minister. She pulled out of the election after being unable to gain the necessary endorsement of 100 MPs, allowing Rishi Sunak to become Conservative leader and Prime Minister unopposed. Sunak later retained Mordaunt in his cabinet, continuing as leader of the House of Commons.

Early life and education
Penelope Mary Mordaunt was born on 4 March 1973 in Torquay, Devon. Her father, John Mordaunt, born at Hilsea Barracks, served in the Parachute Regiment before retraining as a teacher, and later a youth worker for Hampshire County Council. Her mother, Jennifer (née Snowden), was a special needs teacher at several Purbrook schools. Through her mother she is a relative of Philip Snowden, the first Labour Chancellor of the Exchequer. The actress Dame Angela Lansbury was her grandmother's cousin, and she is thus distantly related to the former Labour leader George Lansbury.

Her paternal grandfather, Edward Patrick "Ned" Mordaunt (1900–1982), was born in Canterbury in Kent into an Irish Catholic family from County Wexford in the south-east of Ireland. Having attended both a Christian Brothers school in Dublin and Mungret College in County Limerick, Ned served with the South Irish Horse in the British Army during the final stages of the First World War in 1918; he returned to Ireland in 1919, where he later joined the 'Anti-Treaty' Irish Republican Army (IRA) during the Irish Civil War. Ned Mordaunt later rejoined the British Army, in 1924, and married an English woman.

The Mordaunt family were originally from near Gorey in North Wexford, where the family surname was often spelt and pronounced as 'Morning' up until the 1840s. Penny's paternal great-great-grandfather, Edward Mordaunt (1831–1917), was originally from Ballintlea, a townland just north-west of Gorey, where he was very prominent in the Irish National Land League in the 1880s. Because of his involvement in Land League and other Irish nationalist activities, Edward Mordaunt was evicted from his small farm, forcing him to move to Monamolin, a village further south in County Wexford, where he settled with his family. Penny Mordaunt has two brothers: her twin, James, and a younger brother, Edward. Mordaunt was educated at Oaklands Roman Catholic School in Waterlooville, Hampshire, and studied drama at the Victoryland Theatre School.

Mordaunt was 15 when her mother died of breast cancer and after leaving school, she became her younger brother Edward's primary caregiver. The following year her father was also diagnosed with cancer, from which he recovered. In order to support her time at university Mordaunt worked in a Johnson & Johnson factory, and became a magician's assistant to Will Ayling, a past president of the Portsmouth and District Magic Circle and of the British Ring of the International Brotherhood of Magicians.

Mordaunt has attributed her interest in politics to her experiences whilst working in hospitals and orphanages of Romania while that country was in the aftermath of the 1989 revolution.

Mordaunt read philosophy at the University of Reading, graduating in 1995 with upper second class honours. Although her parents had both undertaken further education, Mordaunt  was the first member of her family to attend university. Mordaunt was active in student politics and served as president of the Reading University Students' Union.

Commercial and professional career

After graduation, Mordaunt's employment was focused on public relations in various sectors. Under Prime Minister John Major she was Head of Youth for the Conservative Party, before working for two years as Head of Broadcasting for the party under party leader William Hague (1999–2001). She worked as a communications specialist for the Freight Transport Association (now Logistics UK) from 1997 to 1999. In 2000, she worked briefly as Head of Foreign Press for George W. Bush's presidential campaign.

She was Communications Director for the Royal Borough of Kensington and Chelsea from 2001 to 2003, before leaving to set up a new Anglo-American website called 'virtualconservatives'. Lord Moylan, who was the deputy leader of Kensington and Chelsea council where Mordaunt was hired as a Director of Communications, said: "We had to get rid of her after a few months because she was incompetent."

From 2004 to 2006, she was a director of Media Intelligence Partners.

Mordaunt worked for the Bush campaign again in 2004. She was a director at the Community Fund, which merged with the New Opportunities Fund to create the Big Lottery Fund, and created the Veterans Reunited programme, enabling service men and women to visit World War II battlefields and be involved in commemorative events. Mordaunt worked for the Big Lottery Fund from 2003 to 2005. In 2006, she became one of six directors at charity Diabetes UK, a role she held until 2009.

Parliamentary career

Member of Parliament for Portsmouth North: 2010–present
In November 2003, Mordaunt was selected as Conservative candidate to contest Portsmouth North in the 2005 general election. She attained a 5.5% swing towards the Conservatives, but lost to Labour candidate Sarah McCarthy-Fry by 1,139 votes. A critic of women-only shortlists, Mordaunt worked after the 2005 election as chief of staff for David Willetts's aborted leadership campaign.

Mordaunt was re-selected in January 2006 to contest Portsmouth North at the 2010 general election. At the election, she won the seat with an 8.6% swing from Labour, giving her a 7,289 majority. She was re-elected at the 2015, 2017, and 2019 general elections.

After her election in 2010, she was a member of the Public Bill Committee for the Defence Reform Act 2014. In Parliament, she has also previously sat on the Privacy and Injunctions (Joint Committee), the Defence Committee, the European Scrutiny Committee and the Committees on Arms Export Controls (formerly Quadripartite Committee).

In 2014, Mordaunt proposed the loyal address in reply to the Queen's speech from the throne.

When receiving the Speech of the Year award at The Spectator magazine's Parliamentarian of the Year Awards in November 2014, Mordaunt said that she had delivered a speech in the House of Commons just before the Easter recess in 2013 on poultry welfare so as to use the word "cock", as a forfeit for a misdemeanour during Naval Reserve training. She used the word "cock" six times and "lay" or "laid" five times. Following her comments, she was accused by Labour MP Kate Hoey of trivialising parliament.

Ministerial career: 2014–2017
Mordaunt was appointed Parliamentary Under-Secretary of State for Decentralisation at the Department for Communities and Local Government by Prime Minister David Cameron in the 2014 cabinet reshuffle.

During Mordaunt's time as Parliamentary Under-Secretary for Decentralisation, she was accused by the Fire Brigades Union "of misleading MPs over assurances given to firefighters from fire authorities regarding what would happen to their pensions if they fail fitness tests". This dispute led to strike action by firefighters over the increase of retirement age.

Mordaunt was appointed Minister of State for the Armed Forces in May 2015, becoming the first woman to hold the post. Major Robert Campbell, who was investigated and exonerated over the death of an Iraqi in 2003, criticised Mordaunt for backing the Iraq Historic Allegations Team while she was Armed Forces Minister, stating: "Now she is depicting herself as the armed forces champion but she never did anything for me. She needs to apologise for how we were treated. She failed us as armed forces champion."

In July 2016, following Theresa May's appointment as Prime Minister, Mordaunt was appointed Minister of State for Disabled People, Work and Health at the Department for Work and Pensions.

Secretary of State for International Development: 2017–2019

Mordaunt was promoted to the Cabinet as Secretary of State for International Development by Prime Minister Theresa May on 9 November 2017, after Priti Patel resigned.

In February 2018, an investigation by The Times newspaper revealed allegations of misconduct by Oxfam staff operating in Haiti, in the aftermath of the 2010 earthquake. Mordaunt argued that Oxfam, which had received £32m in Government funds in the previous financial year, had failed in its "moral leadership" over the scandal. She also said that Oxfam did "absolutely the wrong thing" by not reporting the detail of the allegations to the Government. Mordaunt felt it was important for aid organisations to report offences because she suspected that there were paedophiles "targeting" the charity sector in order to carry out predatory activities.

Minister for Women and Equalities: 2018–2019
She became Minister for Women and Equalities in April 2018, replacing Amber Rudd, who had resigned following the Windrush scandal. In July 2018 she became the first minister to use sign language in the House of Commons, to applause from all sides. In March 2019, she was criticised in a newspaper article by Maya Forstater, who claimed she had not answered to Mumsnet users' satisfaction questions on sex and gender during a webchat held on International Women's Day. Mordaunt had received many questions regarding women and transgender people that she did not answer.

Secretary of State for Defence: 2019

On 1 May 2019, Mordaunt was appointed as the first female Secretary of State for Defence following dismissal of Gavin Williamson. After Boris Johnson was elected Conservative leader and appointed Prime Minister, he sacked Mordaunt as Defence Secretary and she left the Government on 24 July 2019. Mordaunt had been a prominent supporter of Johnson's opponent, Jeremy Hunt, in the 2019 Conservative Party leadership election.

Ministerial career: 2020–2022
In a cabinet reshuffle in February 2020, Mordaunt re-entered the Government, joining the Cabinet Office as Paymaster General in succession to Oliver Dowden. She was the UK alternate co-chair of the EU Withdrawal Agreement Joint Committee. She was made Minister of State for Trade Policy in the 2021 cabinet reshuffle. Lord Frost was critical of her time as his deputy in the Brexit negotiations, saying he had "grave reservations" about her being Prime Minister and that "she did not master the detail that was necessary when we were in negotiations".

Conservative Party leadership contest, July–September 2022

In July 2022, Mordaunt launched an ultimately unsuccessful bid to be the next Conservative leader and consequently UK prime minister. An early promotional video published by her campaign attracted criticism for featuring footage of former professional sprinter Oscar Pistorius, who murdered his girlfriend Reeva Steenkamp in 2013. Athlete Jonnie Peacock requested to be removed from the same video published by her campaign. Mordaunt's campaign edited the video to remove footage of Peacock and Pistorius, and later issued a third edition of the video with a short clip of the murdered Labour MP Jo Cox removed, following a request from Cox's family.

In 2018, Mordaunt, the then women and equalities minister, told MPs that "trans men are men, trans women are women" at the launch of a consultation on reforming the Gender Recognition Act. Several Conservative activists criticised Mordaunt "for her pro-trans stance" according to reports by the Daily Telegraph published on 8 July 2022 the day after Boris Johnson's resignation as Conservative party leader. On the following day, shortly before she launched her bid for the leadership of the Conservative party, Mordaunt responded to the question "Do I know what a woman is?" by writing on Twitter: "I am biologically a woman. If I have a hysterectomy or mastectomy, I am still a woman. And I am legally a woman. Some people born male and who have been through the gender recognition process are also legally female. That DOES NOT mean they are biological women, like me." The Spectator noted Mordaunt's earlier stance on trans issues, and was critical of what it called her "cowardice" in changing her publicly stated views, being "willing to toss them overboard at her earliest convenience" during her leadership campaign. The Times described her as a "socially liberal Brexiteer".

Mordaunt was one of eight contenders who achieved the necessary 20 nominations by 12 July deadline. Three other candidates had to drop out earlier that day.

On 20 July, Mordaunt was eliminated from the fifth round of the leadership competition after failing to secure sufficient support from Conservative MPs.

On 1 August 2022, Mordaunt declared her support for Liz Truss in the final round of the leadership contest.

Parliamentary support 

The following table shows how many MPs supported Mordaunt during each election round:

Leader of the House of Commons: 2022–present

On 6 September 2022, Mordaunt was appointed Leader of the House of Commons and Lord President of the Council. Four days later, as Lord President of the Council, she presided over the Accession Ceremony of King Charles III. During a debate in the House of Commons, Mordaunt deputised for Liz Truss to receive a question from Leader of the Labour Party Keir Starmer.

Conservative Party leadership election, October 2022

Following the resignation of Liz Truss during the October 2022 United Kingdom government crisis, Mordaunt declared she would seek nomination in the ensuing Conservative Party leadership election. However, after only 27 MPs publicly backed her nomination, she pulled out of the election, allowing Rishi Sunak to become leader unopposed. She tweeted her withdrawal two minutes before the 2pm deadline on 24 October, by which candidates needed to have 100 nominations, and then issued a statement.

Views and activities

Splash! appearance
In 2014, Mordaunt appeared on reality television programme Splash!. Although her Labour opponents criticised the media appearance, questioning whether her focus should instead have been on her constituency work, Mordaunt stated that the response was overwhelmingly positive and defended her appearance, stating that she was donating all of her £10,000 appearance fee plus any additional sponsorship to charity; £7,000 towards the renovation of her local lido and the rest to four armed services charities.

Brexit
In the 2016 United Kingdom European Union membership referendum, Mordaunt supported Brexit. During the referendum campaign, Mordaunt said the United Kingdom did not have a veto to Turkey joining the European Union. Given this is a provision of the Treaty on European Union, Mordaunt was accused of 'lying' over the matter. When challenged about her claim, Mordaunt said: "There is a provision for a veto but we could not have used it because David Cameron gave an undertaking that he would support their accession and having given that undertaking to a NATO country, he would not have been able to walk away." She reiterated her defence of her 2016 comments during her Conservative Party leadership campaign in July 2022.

Northern Ireland
Mordaunt voted in favour of legalising same-sex marriage in Northern Ireland. She has said in the House of Commons that the Northern Ireland protocol creates unique disadvantages for Northern Ireland.

Homeopathy
Mordaunt has repeatedly advocated that the British National Health Service should fund the availability of homeopathy. In 2010, she signed a Parliamentary Early Day Motion that claimed there was "overwhelming anecdotal evidence that homeopathy is effective" and called for the government to "maintain a policy of allowing health commissions to refer to homeopathic doctors and approved homeopaths".

Muslim Council of Britain meeting
Since 2009, Labour, the Conservative-Liberal Democrat coalition and Conservative governments have maintained a policy of "non-engagement" with the Muslim Council of Britain due to allegations the group does not represent the British Muslim community and claims that members of the council had made 'favourable' remarks about extremists in the past.

As Paymaster General, Mordaunt met with the Secretary General of the MCB, Zara Mohammed, which Alan Mendoza of the Henry Jackson Society described as "shocking". A Government spokesperson told The Jewish Chronicle: "The UK government has a long-standing policy of not engaging with the MCB and that has not changed."

Royal yachts
In June 2020, Mordaunt produced a proposal for a pair of ships with the primary role of specialising in trade, research, and humanitarian work. The vessels were to be funded by private, research, commercial and charitable funds, in partnership with the UK's Overseas Development Assistance budget. The vessels could also be used as "cost effective and secure" accommodation for members of the Royal Family on visits, so would effectively be successor to the Royal Yacht Britannia which had been decommissioned in 1997. Mordaunt said of it, “We know that industry would also support  as would a growing coalition of commercial and trade ventures, research organisations, shipbuilders and ship support companies, maritime training organisations and medical and health projects”. The director of the Global Britain Programme at the Henry Jackson Society, said: "These new ships will help project Britain's image around the world".

Vandalism of war memorials
In June 2020, in response to vandalism of war memorials, Mordaunt stated: "I would like to suggest that for some found guilty of vandalising such memorials they might benefit from some time spent with our service personnel – perhaps at a battle camp. That might give them a new appreciation of just what these people go through for their sakes."

Naval service

Mordaunt was commissioned into the Royal Naval Reserve, serving from 2010 until 2019. From 2010 until 2015, she served as an Acting Sub-Lieutenant, at shore establishment  on Whale Island, Portsmouth. In May 2015 she was placed onto Reserve 'List 6', a category for personnel unable to meet any training commitment in excess of a year; she had "no annual training commitment and received no remuneration" from the Royal Navy during this time. She remained on List 6 until April 2019, at which point she left the Reserve. Appointed Honorary Commander in April 2019, she was promoted Honorary Captain RNR on 30 June 2021.

In 2022, George Freeman MP incorrectly claimed that Mordaunt had fought in the navy, with a navy source responding by saying that Mordaunt is not currently "a trained or paid reservist, she's never qualified or commissioned. She’s been banging the naval drum for days and enough is enough. How she has presented herself – and how she has allowed herself to be presented – have been deeply misleading."

Personal life
Mordaunt has been a member of the British Astronomical Association, and as of 2013 was chair of the Wymering Manor Trust in Portsmouth. She ran the League of Friends visiting team at the Queen Alexandra Hospital in Portsmouth for eight years. She is a patron of the Victoria Cross Trust, and Enable Ability, a disability charity based in Portsmouth, in addition to being a Scouting ambassador.

Mordaunt met Paul Murray when they were both students at the University of Reading and married him in 1999, but this ended in divorce the following year. She was by 2015 in a long-term relationship with businessman Ian Lyon, a part-time classical singer. Mordaunt's hobbies include astronomy, painting, dance and music. She owns four Burmese cats. Following the 2022 Russian invasion of Ukraine she took a Ukrainian refugee into her home.

In July 2022, Hampshire Police said they were investigating death threats sent to Mordaunt. She strengthened her security after a letter was sent to her constituency office threatening to "shoot her in the head" and "kill her family" if she did not quit as an MP.

Publications
Greater: Britain after the storm (with Chris Lewis, 2021)

References

External links

Official website
Penny Mordaunt at the Conservative Party

|-

|-

|-

|-

|-

|-

|-

|-

1973 births
Living people
People educated at Oaklands Catholic School
Alumni of the University of Reading
Politicians from Portsmouth
Conservative Party (UK) MPs for English constituencies
English people of Irish descent
Female defence ministers
Female members of the Cabinet of the United Kingdom
Female members of the Parliament of the United Kingdom for English constituencies
Members of the Privy Council of the United Kingdom
United Kingdom Paymasters General
Ministers for Women and Equalities
Royal Navy officers
Secretaries of State for Defence (UK)
English twins
UK MPs 2010–2015
UK MPs 2015–2017
UK MPs 2017–2019
UK MPs 2019–present
Women in the Royal Navy
Royal Naval Reserve personnel
21st-century English women politicians
Politicians from Torquay
Military personnel from Torquay
Lord Presidents of the Council
Women's ministers of the United Kingdom
British Eurosceptics
Participants in British reality television series